Super D is a 2004 EP by Ben Folds.

Super D may also refer to:

 Super D (cycling), a class of mountain bike race
 Various 0-8-0 steam locomotives of the London and North Western Railway:
 LNWR Class G1
 LNWR Class G2
 LNWR Class G2A
 My Super D, Philippine TV series
 Super D, an American drugstore chain acquired by Walgreens Company